Ornithogalum viridiflorum, syn. Galtonia viridiflora, the green flowered Galtonia, is a species of bulbous flowering plant from South Africa and Lesotho, grown as an ornamental plant in gardens. It is often sold under its older name Galtonia viridiflora.

Description 
Perennial bulbous geophyte,  with strap-shaped leaves and erect stems up to 1 m in height. The inflorescence consists of a cone-shaped terminal raceme. The flowers, which appear in late summer, are pendant, bell-shaped and yellow to green (hence the name viridiflorum).

Cultivation 
Requires well-drained soil and prefers full sun. In colder climates, mulching or lifting and over wintering are necessary. The leaves and stems are shorter than Ornithogalum candicans with which it is sometimes confused. The latter has white flowers,

References

Bibliography 

 
 
 

viridiflorum